The Ambassador Extraordinary and Plenipotentiary of the Russian Federation to the Republic of Austria is the official representative of the President and the Government of the Russian Federation to the President and the Government of the Republic of Austria.

The ambassador and his staff work at large in the Embassy of Russia in Vienna.

History of diplomatic relations

 

The first ambassador of Russia to Austria was Prince Dmitry Mikhailovich Golitsyn and he served in this position from 1763 until 1792. Gallitzinstraße, the street where his ambassadorial villa was located is named after him. In 1792 Count Andrey Kirillovich Razumovsky became ambassador in Vienna, where he kept contact with representatives of the European aristocracy, politicians and artists. While in Vienna, he built the Palais Rasumofsky, and also financed construction of a stone bridge across the Danube. As a patron of the arts, Razumovsky established an art gallery, and commissioned Beethoven to compose the famous Razumovsky string quartets.

Austria is closely linked to the fate of prominent Russian diplomat and statesman Prince Alexander Mikhailovich Gorchakov. He arrived in Vienna in 1833 as an adviser to the embassy, and, from 1854 to 1856, he led the Russian diplomatic mission. Gorchakov became Envoy Extraordinary and Minister Plenipotentiary to the Austrian court at the most difficult period for Russia during the Crimean War, during which time he was able to preserve diplomatic relations with Austria and helped to overcome the international isolation of the Russian Empire and reinforced Russia's status as a great power. The Vienna Conference in 1855 was the first presence of Gorchakov in an international forum, and his performance in representing Russia at the Paris Conference of 1856 saw Alexander II appoint him as Russian Minister of Foreign Affairs.

In 1882, scientist and diplomat Prince Aleksey Borisovich Lobanov-Rostovsky was appointed as the Empire's representative in Vienna. In 1891 he bought several houses on Reisnerstraße from Adolphe I, Grand Duke of Luxembourg, the former Duke of Nassau, which still houses the embassy and consular section in Vienna, and he also began construction of the Nicholas Orthodox Cathedral.

After the collapse of the Austro-Hungarian monarchy in 1918 and the proclamation of the First Austrian Republic, diplomatic relations with the Union of Soviet Socialist Republics were established on 25 February 1924. The first Soviet Plenipotentiary in Vienna was Jan Antonovich Berzin. Diplomatic relations were broken in March 1938 after the German invasion of Austria and its incorporation into Nazi Germany. After the Second World War, the USSR and Austria re-established diplomatic relations at the level of political representation, which in 1953 was converted into embassies. The preamble of the Austrian State Treaty, signed on 15 May 1955 by the USSR, United States, United Kingdom, France and Austria, established that the treaty formed the basis of Soviet relations with Austria. After the dissolution of the Soviet Union, relations continued between the Russian Federation and the Austrian state.

Ambassadors

References

Bibliography

External links 

  Embassy of Russia to Austria

 
Austria
Russia